Moti Lal Nehru Medical College and associated hospitals (MLNMC) is the government medical college with related public hospitals in Allahabad, Uttar Pradesh, India. It was founded in memory of Pandit Motilal Nehru.

History and formation
On 7 November 1854, Leslie Hudson, a member of British Parliament raised a question about British Government's plan to open medical colleges in India which was under the rule of British East India Company then. Replying to that, Sir Charles Wood, the minister concerned announced that by 1861 medical colleges would be opened in five cities of India, namely Bombay, Calcutta, Madras, Lahore and Allahabad. Pt. Motilal Nehru was the chief spokesperson of the deputation that called on Lord Curzon, the then Viceroy of India, on 17 November 1904 at Allahabad in leadership of Pt. Madan Mohan Malviya. During this meet, Pt. Motilal Nehru reminded the Viceroy of the promise made by the British Government 50 years back and told him that it was a matter of deep regret that there was no medical college in Allahabad, which at that time was the capital of the United Province.

Moti Lal Nehru Medical College was formally inaugurated on 5 May 1961 by the President of India, Dr. Rajendra Prasad, just one day prior to Nehru's 100th birthday, and a century after the proposed time by the British Govt. Initially the premises of the British District Jail at South Malaka were acquired for the college. Pt. Motilal Nehru was kept imprisoned there in 1930 during British rule for his leading role in the freedom movement and released only after severe illness, which resulted in his death on 6 February 1931. Later, in 1963, the Government House, which used to be residence of the Governor of United Province, was acquired for the college while the jail premises were transformed into Swaroop Rani Nehru Hospital (named after Pt. Motilal Nehru's wife).

Today the college is recognised by Medical Council of India for imparting medical education of undergraduate and post graduate degree /diploma level in various specialities, with Swaroop Rani Nehru Hospital, Kamla Nehru Memorial Hospital, Sarojini Naidu Children's Hospital and Manohar Das Eye Hospital serving under its affiliation.

Academics
Every year a batch of 200 students is admitted to the first year of MBBS degree course of the college. 180 students are admitted through state counseling based on UP state rank in NEET, 20 are admitted through all India counseling based on all India rank in NEET conducted by NTA . Similarly admissions to various postgraduate courses are also taken through similar entrance test organised by the government.

Upgradation
The Government of India has decided to upgrade the institute on lines of All India Institute of Medical Sciences as part of phase-3 of Pradhan Mantri Swasthya Suraksha Yojana (PMSSY) whereby the Central Government will bear 80% of the cost of upgradation and 20% cost will be borne by State Government.

References

External links
 

Medical colleges in Uttar Pradesh
Universities and colleges in Allahabad
Science and technology in Allahabad
Educational institutions established in 1961
1961 establishments in Uttar Pradesh